The following article presents a summary of the 1986 football (soccer) season in Brazil, which was the 85th season of competitive football in the country.

Campeonato Brasileiro Série A

Quarterfinals

|}

Semifinals

|}

Final

São Paulo declared as the Campeonato Brasileiro champions by aggregate score of 3-3.

State championship champions

Youth competition champions

Other competition champions

Brazilian clubs in international competitions

Brazil national team
The following table lists all the games played by the Brazil national football team in official competitions and friendly matches during 1986.

Women's football

National team
The following table lists all the games played by the Brazil women's national football team in official competitions and friendly matches during 1986.

Domestic competition champions

References

 Brazilian competitions at RSSSF
 1986 Brazil national team matches at RSSSF
 1986 Brazil women's national team matches at RSSSF

 
Seasons in Brazilian football
Brazil